Charles Zwygart (born 12 November 1958) is a retired Swiss football midfielder.

References

1958 births
Living people
Swiss men's footballers
FC La Chaux-de-Fonds players
BSC Young Boys players
Servette FC players
Neuchâtel Xamax FCS players
FC Wettingen players
FC Martigny-Sports players
Swiss Super League players
Association football midfielders
Switzerland under-21 international footballers